Rapid phase transition or RPT is a phenomenon realized in liquefied natural gas (LNG) incidents in which LNG vaporizes violently upon coming in contact with water causing what is known as a physical explosion
or cold explosion.

LNG Properties

Liquefied natural gas or LNG is a natural gas that gets liquefied at atmospheric pressure and −161.5 °C. It is odorless, tasteless, colorless, and not poisonous but causes asphyxia. It can cause frostbite due to its cryogenic temperature. If this extremely cold LNG is mixed with water(e.g. sea water, which has an average temperature of 15 °C), heat energy is transferred from the water to the LNG, rapidly vaporizing it from its liquefied state back into its original gaseous state. This results in an explosion because the volume occupied by natural gas in its gaseous form is 600 times greater than when its liquefied. This is the phenomenon of rapid phase transition.

See also
 Dry ice bomb
 BLEVE
 Explosive boiling or phase explosion

External links
 Latest developments in rapid-phase-transition modeling
 Glossary of LNG-Related Terms & Definitions

References

Phase transitions
Explosions
Liquefied natural gas